Kishore Namit Kapoor (born 1949) is an Indian actor, author and acting teacher. He has trained some of the most prominent film and television actors of the Hindi industry including Hrithik Roshan, Priyanka Chopra, Kareena Kapoor, Ranveer Singh and Vicky Kaushal.

His books on acting, "You Are The Instrument, You Are The Player" and "Acting in Everyday Life" were published in 2003 and 2012 respectively.

Early life and education 

Kishore Namit Kapoor was born in Delhi in post-independence India. In 1958, he joined All India Radio (AIR) as a child artist. When Doordarshan, India's first public service broadcaster, began telecasting live plays in 1962, Kapoor was one of the first child actors to feature in their weekly plays.

He joined K.M. College in 1964, which was prominent in Delhi as the alumni institute of Amitabh Bachchan, Kulbushan Kharbanda and Dinesh Thakur. At Abhyaan, a Delhi theatre group of the time, Kapoor acted in various plays with director Rajendra Nath.

After completing a Masters in Philosophy from Hindu College, Delhi, Kapoor joined the Film and Television Institute of India (FTII) in 1970. After completing the course, he moved to Mumbai.

Career 

Kapoor acted in several films between 1972 and 1991. Aakrant and Sweekar released in 1973. He acted with Amitabh Bachchan and Sanjeev Kumar in Farar (1975) and with Manoj Kumar in Kranti (1981). He also acted in the first full-length television feature film made in India – P. Kumar Vasudev's Guru (1975).

In television, he was the lead in Pratham Pratishruti, telecast on Doordarashan in 1990 and based on the book by Ashapurna Devi. With Sharukh Khan, he acted in Umeed (1989).

He briefly returned to acting in a short film A Trip to Egypt (2014).

In 1983, he founded his own training academy for film and television actors. Over the last three decades, he has trained some of the most prominent actors of this industry.

Personal life 

Kapoor has four children. His eldest son, Kabira Namit, acted with him in A Trip To Egypt. His younger son, Bahaish Kapoor, is a short film director, cinematographer and composer.

Filmography 

 1992 Nishchaiy
 1991 Sajan
 1990 Sailaab
 1989 Paap Ka Ant
 1989 Taaqatwar
 1987 Vishaal
 1986 Love 86
 1985 Sarfarosh
 1984 Phulwari
 1983 Sun Meri Laila
 1982 Ashanti
 1982 Sun Sajna
 1981 Commander
 1981 Armaan
 1981 Kranti
 1980 Sitara
 1979 Zulm Ki Pukaar
 1976 Sajjo Rani
 1976 Aarambh
 1975 Faraar
 1973 Sweekar
 1973 Aakrant

References 

1949 births
Indian drama teachers
Male actors in Hindi cinema
Indian male film actors
Male actors from Delhi
Living people